The Pashalik of Berat was a pashalik created in modern-day central Albania by Ahmet Kurt Pasha in 1774 and dissolved after Ahmet's ally, Ibrahim Pasha of Berat was defeated by Ali Pasha in 1809, thus incorporating the pashalik, with the Pashalik of Janina. This pashalik was one of the three pashaliks created by Albanians in the period of Albanian Pashaliks.

Creation and rule of Ahmet Pasha
The Pashalik of Berat was created after Ahmet Kurt Pasha managed to complot with the Sublime Porte against Mehmed Pasha Bushati in 1774. For his service, the sultan gave him territories in central Albania. He managed to grow his pashalik until his death in 1787, incorporating territories of all central Albania, bordering to the north with the Pashalik of Scutari and to the south with the Pashalik of Janina.
Ahmet Kurt Pasha was the grandfather of Ali Pasha, and father of Ali's mother, Hanka.

The sanjakbey of Avlona was also the Pasha of Berat until 1809.

Conquest by Ali Pasha
After the death of Ahmet Kurt Pasha, the territory of the pashalik was ruled by a close ally of him, Ibrahim Pasha of Berat.
As this territory belonged to the Middle Albania, Ibrahim Pasha was roused at this encroachment. This made Ali Pasha start a war with the Pashalik of Berat. After some fruitless negotiation, Ibrahim Pasha sent a body of troops under the command of his brother Sephir, bey of Avlona. Against these, Ali summoned the armatoles of Thessaly; and after villages had been burnt, peasants robbed and hanged, and flocks carried off on both sides, peace was made. Ibrahim gave his daughter in marriage to Mukhtar, the eldest son of Ali, and the disputed territory as her dower. As Sephir bey had displayed qualities which might prove formidable hereafter, Ali contrived to have him poisoned by a physician; and, after his usual fashion, he hanged the agent of the crime, that no witness might remain of it. Ali Pasha has said that he should prevail over the pasha of Berat, become vizir of Epirus, fight with the Sultan, and go to Constantinople. In 1808, Ali Pasha defeated Ibrahim Pasha, incorporating its territory in the Pashalik of Janina.

Economy

Pasha
Ahmet Kurt Pasha        1774-1787
Ibrahim Pasha of Berat  1787-1809

See also
Pashalik of Scutari
Pashalik of Janina
Albania under the Ottoman Empire

References

Sources 
 "History of Albanian People" Albanian Academy of Science. 

History of Berat
States and territories established in 1774
Former countries in the Balkans
Vassal states of the Ottoman Empire